Ojapali is a traditional shamanistic type of indigenous folk dance from Assam in the northeastern region of India. Ojapali is believed to have evolved from Kathakata tradition and is performed in a group; it is believed to be one of the oldest art forms of Assam. Originally evolved in the Kamata state the western and northern part of river Brahmaputra later limited to Darrang area under the patronisation of Darrangi King Dharmanarayana.
The repertoire of this performance consists of songs, dialogues, gesture, improvised acting and dramatisation etc. The group consists of an Oja, who leads the performance and four or five palies, who supplement the performance with continuously playing cymbal. Among the Palies Daina pali who stand on the right-hand side of the Oja is the active one and he and Oja take the performance forward. Many believe that Shankardev took inspiration from Ojapali to create his Ankiya Bhaona. Moreover he also created his own Sattriya Ojapali. Generally Darrangi Suknanni Ojapali sings the lyrics written by Sukabi Narayanadeva in Padmapurana. Padma Purana covers the story of serpent goddess Maroi(manasa devi). Ojapali is associated with Shakti Puja, including the deities manasa, kali, durga, kesikhaiti, kakogoshani etc. 

Present day Ojapali is limited to Darrang, Nalbari, Kamrup, Bajali, Baksa, Mangaldoi, Sipajhar, some other parts of Tezpur and Udalguri district. Lalit Chandra Nath and Kinaram Nath have been awarded Sangeet Natak Akademi Award for their contribution to this art form. Presently Lalit Chandra Nath Oja's family is working towards Ojapali's development in Sipajhar. 

Ojapali can be divided into three forms based on the occasion and style:
 or 
 or

Noted personalities
 Manka 
 Durgabar Kayastha 
 Pitambar
 Barbyahu 
 Sarubyahu 
 Lalit Chandra Nath, also known as Lalit Oja (Sangeet Natak Akademi Award winner)
 Manka
In Mangaldai Baloram konwar and his team performed Byakh ojapali for about two decades around 90s to 2010. Baloram konwar is the disciple of Oja late Upendra kalita. They were all government service holder and to continue their hobby they learnt it and performed. It was a saying that people around mangaldai and other localities were very much eager to see this group performing as they were the first educated performer and also able to bring the performance in fantastic manner.

References

Dances of Assam
Indian folk dances